ISO 4031 is a superseded international standard first issued in 1978 by the International Organization for Standardization. It defined the representation of local time differentials, commonly referred to as time zones. It has since been superseded by ISO 8601. This newer standard has set out the formats for local time differentials since 1988, so ISO 4031 is no longer in use.

References

04031